Gregory R. Ciottone (born 1965) is an American physician specializing in disaster medicine and counter-terrorism medicine. He is an associate professor of emergency medicine at Harvard Medical School and the founding director of the BIDMC Fellowship in Disaster Medicine, the first of its kind in a Harvard teaching hospital. As well, he holds the position of director for medical preparedness at the National Preparedness Leadership Initiative, a joint program of the Harvard T.H.Chan School of Public Health and the Center for Public Leadership at the Harvard John F. Kennedy School of Government. He also serves as a consultant to the White House Medical Unit for the Obama, Trump, and Biden administrations. In 2019 he was elected president of the World Association for Disaster and Emergency Medicine. (WADEM).

Biography
Born in Washington, D.C., and residing in Westminster, Massachusetts, Ciottone attended St. Mark's School in Massachusetts for secondary school and went on to earn his BA in biology and chemistry in 1987 at Colby College, where he graduated Phi Bet Kappa. He then received his MD degree from the University of Massachusetts Medical School (UMMS) in 1991, receiving the Society of Academic Emergency Medicine Award for Excellence in Emergency Medicine. He completed his residency in Emergency Medicine at UMMS in 1994 and was selected as chief resident. He continued on at that institution, being appointed instructor of medicine in 1994, and later assistant professor of emergency medicine at UMMS, where he also served as director of the Institute for Disaster and Emergency Medicine, and then director of the Division of International Disaster and Emergency Medicine. In 1995 Dr. Ciottone was selected to lead the Washington DC-based American International Health Alliance (AIHA) Emergency Medicine Task Force for the former Soviet Union. He served as co-director of the EMS/Disaster Medicine Fellowship program at UMMS, and in 1998 was appointed a Disaster Medicine Fellowship Director for the International Atomic Energy Agency in Geneva Switzerland. In 1999 he was selected as Director of the University of Massachusetts-Minsk Belarus Medical Partnership program by AIHA.

In January 2001 Ciottone was appointed director of the Division of International Disaster and Emergency Medicine in the Department of Emergency Medicine at Beth Israel Deaconess Medical Center. He went on to become the chairman of the International Emergency Medicine Section, Division of Emergency Medicine at Harvard Medical School from 2002 to 2007, and was named chairman of the Disaster Medicine Section at HMS in 2007. Also in 2007, he founded the BIDMC Fellowship in Disaster Medicine. He rose to the level of Associate Professor of Emergency Medicine at Harvard Medical School in 2014.

Career
Ciottone's research and career interests have been in the area of Disaster Medicine. He has served as a consultant in more than 30 countries, including establishing 16 Disaster and Emergency Medicine training centers throughout the former Soviet Union in the 1990s. He also served as the Commander of the Disaster Medical Assistance Team, Massachusetts 2 (DMAT MA-2) leading it as one of the first federal teams into Ground Zero on 9/11/2001. In 2006, Dr. Ciottone became Editor-in Chief of Disaster Medicine, later renamed Ciottone’s Disaster Medicine for the second edition, which was released in 2016 and deemed “The leading textbook in the field” by the journal Annals of Emergency Medicine. Through his textbook, Ciottone first suggested the requirement that Emergency Management be a part of the knowledge base necessary for the practice of Disaster Medicine, something that is commonly accepted today. In addition to his textbook, he has written over 100 scholarly articles, chapters, and educational materials.

In recent years, Ciottone has played a leading role in establishing a new Initiative he named Counter-Terrorism Medicine (CTM), publishing over 30 peer-reviews articles on the subject. Focusing on mitigation, preparedness, and response to asymmetric terrorist attacks. In 2017, the World Association of Disaster and Emergency Medicine (WADEM) named him the Director of their new Special Interest Group: Counter-Terrorism Medicine.

Ciottone has served as subject matter expert for CNN, SKY news, ABC, and other major news outlets, and has given the Keynote Address or Featured Speaker presentation at numerous international conferences. He was recognized for "Outstanding Achievement in Support of The White House Medical Unit and the President of the United States", and has been inducted as an honorary fellow into the Royal College of Surgeons in Ireland. He was also the 2018 recipient of the Disaster Medical Sciences award from the American College of Emergency Physicians. In 2020 he won the Distinguished Service Award from the American Academy of Disaster Medicine.

References

1965 births
Living people
American emergency physicians
Colby College alumni
Disaster medicine
Harvard Medical School faculty
St. Mark's School (Massachusetts) alumni
University of Massachusetts Medical School alumni